Manuel Hawayek (17 March 1945 – 4 November 2022) was a Puerto Rican former sports shooter. He competed at the 1972, 1976 and the 1984 Summer Olympics.

References

1945 births
2022 deaths
Puerto Rican male sport shooters
Olympic shooters of Puerto Rico
Shooters at the 1972 Summer Olympics
Shooters at the 1976 Summer Olympics
Shooters at the 1984 Summer Olympics
20th-century Puerto Rican people
Sportspeople from San Juan, Puerto Rico